Viktoryia Hasper (born 9 January 1988) is a Belarusian basketball player who competed in the 2008 Summer Olympics.

References

1988 births
Living people
Belarusian women's basketball players
Olympic basketball players of Belarus
Basketball players at the 2008 Summer Olympics
Basketball players from Minsk
Centers (basketball)